The 2006 Primera División de Chile season was both 79th and 80th season of top-flight football in Chile.

Torneo Apertura

The 2006 Torneo Apertura was the first tournament in the 2006 season of the Chilean Primera División. The tournament also was known as Copa Banco Estado for sponsorship reasons.

The defending champions is Universidad Católica that won their 9th Primera División title the last season, after defeat Universidad de Chile in the playoffs finals.

Qualification stage

Group standings

Repechaje

Aggregate table

Playoffs

Top goalscorers

Torneo Clausura

The 2006 Torneo Clausura was the season's second tournament. Colo-Colo was the defending champion after beating its rivals Universidad de Chile in the Torneo Apertura final.

Qualifications

Group standings

Aggregate table

Repechaje

Playoffs

Relegation table

Promotion playoffs

Top goalscorers

References

External links
RSSSF Chile 2006

Apertura